Tamburini Corse is an Italian-Sammarinese motorcycle manufacturer. It was founded in 2009 by Andrea Tamburini, son of Massimo Tamburini, originally producing small metal components.

Motorcycle designs
 MV Agusta Brutale Tamburini Corse T1 (99 produced)
 Tamburini Corse T12 Massimo

References

Motorcycle manufacturers of Italy